Ortaören can refer to:

 Ortaören, Bağlar
 Ortaören, İspir
 Ortaören, Silifke